Andrine Benjaminsen (born 23 August 1995) is a Norwegian orienteer and ski orienteer.

Career
Benjaminsen represented Norway at the 2017 World Orienteering Championships in Tartu, Estonia, where her best result was ninth place in the long distance. In ski orienteering, she won a bronze medal at the 2013 and 2015 Junior World Championships. At the 2021 European Orienteering Championships she won a bronze medal in the Knock-out sprint, and a bronze medal in the Sprint relay with the Norwegian team.

At the 2021 World Orienteering Championships in the Czech Republic, she placed 10th in the sprint. She won a silver medal in the mixed sprint relay with the Norwegian team, after a close fight with Swiss Elena Roos on the last leg. She also won a silver medal in the middle distance, behind winner Tove Alexandersson.

Personal life
Benjaminsen's parents are Finnish orienteer Anne Benjaminsen and Norwegian orienteer Vidar Benjaminsen. Figure skater Juni Marie Benjaminsen is her sister.

References

External links
 
 

1995 births
Living people
Norwegian orienteers
Foot orienteers
Ski-orienteers
Competitors at the 2017 World Games
Norwegian people of Finnish descent
20th-century Norwegian women
21st-century Norwegian women